Sayana (IAST: Sāyaṇa, also called Sāyaṇācārya; died 1387) was a Sanskrit Mimamsa scholar from the Vijayanagara Empire of South India, near modern day Bellary. An influential commentator on the Vedas, he flourished under King Bukka Raya I and his successor Harihara II. More than a hundred works are attributed to him, among which are commentaries on nearly all parts of the Vedas. He also wrote on a number of subjects like medicine, morality, music and grammar.

Early life 
Sāyaṇācārya was born to Mayana (IAST: Māyaṇa) and Shrimati in a Brahmin family that lived in Hampi. He had an elder brother named Madhava (sometimes identified as Vidyaranya) and a younger brother named Bhoganatha (or Somanatha). The family belonged to Bharadvaja gotra, and followed the Taittiriya Shakha (school) of the Krishna Yajurveda.

He was the pupil of Vishnu Sarvajna and of Shankarananda. Both Mādhavāchārya and  Sāyaṇāchārya were said to have studied under Vidyatirtha of Sringeri, and held offices in the Vijayanagara Empire.  Sāyaṇāchārya was a minister, and subsequently prime minister in Bukka Raya's court, and wrote much of his commentary, with his brother and other Brahmins during his ministership.

Works
Sāyaṇa was a Sanskrit-language writer and commentator, and more than a hundred works are attributed to him, among which are commentaries on nearly all parts of the Vedas. Some of these works were actually written by his pupils, and some were written in conjunction with his brother, Vidyāraṇya or Mādhavacārya.

His major work is his commentary on the Vedas, Vedartha Prakasha, literally "the meaning of the Vedas made manifest," written at the request of King Bukka of the Vijayanagara empire "to invest the young kingdom with the prestige it needed." He was probably aided by other scholars, using the interpretations of several authors. The core portion of the commentary was likely written by Sāyaṇāchārya himself, but it also includes contributions of his brother Mādhavāchārya, and additions by his students and later authors who wrote under Sāyaṇāchārya's name. "Sāyaṇa" (or also ) by convention refers to the collective authorship of the commentary as a whole without separating such layers.

Galewicz states that Sayana, a Mimamsa scholar, "thinks of the Veda as something to be trained and mastered to be put into practical ritual use," noticing that "it is not the meaning of the mantras that is most essential [...] but rather the perfect mastering of their sound form." According to Galewicz, Sayana saw the purpose (artha) of the Veda as the "artha of carrying out sacrifice," giving precedence to the Yajurveda. For Sayana, whether the mantras had meaning depended on the context of their practical usage. This conception of the Veda, as a repertoire to be mastered and performed, takes precedence over the internal meaning or "autonomous message of the hymns."

His commentary on the Rigveda was translated from Sanskrit to English by Max Müller, 1823-1900. A new edition, prepared by the Vaidik Samshodhan Mandala (Vedic Research Institute) Pune, under the general editor V. K. Rajwade, was published in 1933 in 4 volumes.

He has also written many lesser manuals called Sudhanidhis treating Prayaschitta (expiation), Yajnatantra (ritual), Purushartha (aims of human endeavour), Subhashita (Collection of moral sayings), Ayurveda (Indian traditional medicine), Sangita Sara (The essence of music), Prayaschitra, Alankara, and  Dhatuvrddhi (grammar)

Influence
According to Dalal, "his work influenced all later scholars, including many European commentators and translators." Sayana's commentary preserved traditional Indian understandings and explanations of the Rigveda, though it also contains mistakes and contradictions. While some 19th century Indologists were quite dismissive of Sayana's commentary, others were more appreciative. His commentary was used as a reference-guide by Ralph T. H. Griffith (1826-1906), John Muir (1810-1882), Horace Hayman Wilson (1786-1860) and other 19th century European Indologists. According to Wilson, Sayana's interpretation was sometimes questionable, but had "a knowledge of his text far beyond the pretension of any European scholar," reflecting the possession "of all the interpretations which had been perpetuated by traditional teaching from the earliest times." Macdonnell (1854-1930) was critical of Sayana's commentary, noting that many difficult words weren't properly understood by Sayana. While Rudolf Roth (1821-1895) aimed at reading the Vedas as "lyrics" without the "theological" background of the interpretations of Yaska and Sayana, Max Müller (1823-1900) published a translation of the Rigvedic Samhitas together with Sayana's commentary. His contemporaries Pischel and Geldner were outspoken about the value of Sayana's commentary:

Modern scholarship is ambivalent. According to Jan Gonda, the translations of the Rigveda published by Griffith and Wilson were "defective," suffering from their reliance on Sayana. Ram Gopal notes that Sayana's commentary contains irreconcilable contradictions and "half-baked" tentative interpretations which are not further investigated, but also states that Sayana's commentary is the "most exhaustive and comprehensive" of all available commentaries, embodying "the gist of a substantial portion of the Vedic interpretations of his predecessors." Swami Dayananda, the founder of Arya Samaj, did not give much significance to his vedic commentaries.

See also 
 Vijayanagara literature

Notes

References

Sources

Further reading 
Max Müller, Rig-Veda Sanskrit-Ausgabe mit Kommentar des Sayana (aus dem 14. Jh. n. Chr.), 6 vols., London 1849-75, 2nd ed. in 4 vols. London 1890 ff.
, Vaidika Samśodhana Mandala, Pune-9 (2nd ed. 1972)
Siddhanatha Sukla The Rgveda Mandala III: A critical study of the Sayana Bhasya and other interpretations of the Rgveda (3.1.1 to 3.7.3)  (2001), .

External links
 Sayana's commentary to the Rigveda
 http://rigveda.sanatana.in/

14th-century writers
Year of birth unknown
Indian Sanskrit scholars
Rigveda
1387 deaths
Scholars of Vijayanagara Empire